The Citroën C5 is a large family car (classified as a crossover station wagon since 2021) produced by the French manufacturer Citroën since March 2001, currently at its third generation. It replaced the Citroën Xantia, in the large family car class, and is the first modern Citroën with "Cx" naming nomenclature, previously used by its ancestors, the C4 and C6 from 1930. The third generation was released in 2021, with crossover styling and marketed as the Citroën C5 X.

First generation (DC/DE; 2001)

The first-generation C5 was available as a five-door liftback or five-door estate styles only. As a liftback, Citroën had completely reversed the design philosophy from the fastback saloon era of Robert Opron. Production commenced in the end of 2000. Sales in the United Kingdom commenced in April 2001.

Power came from 1.8 and 2.0 litre straight-4 and 3.0 litre V6 petrol engines, as well as 1.6, 2.0 and 2.2 litre direct injection diesel engines. The first-generation C5 was the last Citroën developed under the chairmanship of Jacques Calvet (1982–1999). The C5 had a further development of Citroën's hydropneumatic suspension, now called Hydractive 3.

The major change with this system was the use of electronic sensors to replace the mechanical height correctors seen in all previous hydropneumatic cars. This allowed the suspension computer to automatically control ride height: at high speed the suspension is lowered to reduce drag and at low speeds on bumpy roads the ride height is raised.

Manual control of ride height was retained, though it was overridden by the computer if the car was driven at an inappropriate speed for the selected height. Certain cars also featured the computer controlled ride stiffness, called Hydractive 3+.

In a major break with Citroën tradition, the brakes and steering were no longer powered by the same hydraulic system as the suspension, but the power steering used the same LDS fluid with its own pump. It has been speculated that the primary driver for this was the cost of developing electronic brake force distribution for the system, when the PSA Group already had an implementation for conventional brakes.

Another factor may be the highly responsive nature of 'traditional' Citroën brakes, which some have found hard to adjust to on other hydropneumatic cars, though it is felt by some to be superior.

In September 2004, the C5 underwent a major facelift (new front and rear ends; same centre section) to bring it into line with the look of the new Citroën C4. Also, this new version got swivelling directional headlights.

The Hydractive suspension improves ride quality, keeps the car levelled, and enables the car to drive on three wheels if one tire is flat. The suspension is derived from the Hydropneumatic suspension used in the 1950s Citroën DS.

Production ended in December 2007, with the final production number being 720,000. In the United Kingdom, 45,502 models of the car were sold from 2001 to 2004.

Second generation (RD/TD; 2007)

The second-generation C5 was officially unveiled in the beginning of 2008, and does not retain the liftback bodystyle, instead being a regular, three box saloon of an aerodynamic shape.

The C5 Airscape concept, which was presented at the Frankfurt Motor Show in September 2007, gave an outlook on the second-generation C5.

It was launched in February 2008, with the estate version following in May 2008, and receives the name of Tourer. This C5 won 2009 Semperit Irish Car of the Year, as well as being awarded 2008–09 Japan's Import Car of the Year. The second generation was presented on 15 January 2008, having its world premiere at the Brussels Motor Show.

The second-generation C5 is available with conventional springs, as well as the hydropneumatic suspension and 2.7L Ford AJD-V6/PSA DT17 engine from the Citroën C6. In 2009, the 2.7L was replaced by an updated 3.0L unit which, despite offering more power, has improved fuel consumption and emissions.

In 2010, the 2.0L HDi 140 and the 2.2L HDi 173 engines, were replaced by the 2.0L HDi 160 engine, mated to a six speed automatic or manual transmissions to comply with the Euro 5. Similarly, the 2.0L 16V 143 bhp petrol engine was replaced by the 1.6L THP 155, from the DS3 mated to a six speed manual transmission.

In 2011, the C5 was given a mild facelift, with a few cosmetic changes, such as LED lights. Three engines were added to the range consisting of two diesels, 2.0 HDI 160, and a 2.2 HDI 200 as well as a petrol engine, 1.6 VTI 120.

In July 2012, the C5 was given another mild facelift, with a few cosmetic changes, such as softer chevron badging, modified badging of C5, softer chevron "grille" as per the recently updated C4, and exclusive badges (on the Exclusive) on the sides in front of the front doors. For the Exclusive, the onboard GPS/radio head was also changed to the eMyWay unit which features full Bluetooth connectivity and iPod/USB interface.

In May 2016, the C5 was officially withdrawn in the United Kingdom, due to disappointing sales of 17,105 since 2008. In 2015, only 237 cars were sold, the lowest number since the car's launch. This is in comparison to 6,549 sales in France in the same time span. However, this could be due to the model being launched at the start of the financial crisis in 2008, as well as increased demand for crossover models. This also marked the end of right-hand drive production of the C5.

Sharing the same underpinnings of the Citroën C6, which has since been discontinued, this generation of C5 is often referred to also as the "X7". It is observed that on these cars two technical entities, the hydropneumatic system and the double wishbone layout, are utilized in conjunction.

eTouch
Comprising a package of services including the emergency and assistance calls, Citroën eTouch also proposes a virtual maintenance manual, and an Eco Driving service accessible via the MyCitroën personal area on the web. For calls, Citroën eTouch works completely independently.

The system is equipped with a GPS module, and a SIM card, with no need for a call plan and unlimited over time. The vehicles features two buttons, "SOS" for emergency calls (the call is also triggered automatically in the event of impact) and "Double Chevron" for assistance calls.

The emergency call gets emergency services to customers faster, for accident victims and bystanders alike. The two services are free and available at any time. In China, the C5 was heavily restyled in 2017, while in Europe, production officially ended. Since March 2017, the saloon became no longer free to order. However, the Tourer and the CrossTourer remained configurable.

2017 facelift in China

The 2017 facelift for the second-generation C5 in China includes a redesign with the front end of the car completely redesigned, featuring new headlights, grilles, and bumper, and giving it an updated front face, and a slightly revised rear with new tail lamps. The 2017 facelift C5 model was powered by the same range of engines used in the pre-facelift model in China. Engine options include a 1.6-liter turbo gasoline engine with 167 horsepower (124 kilowatts) and a bigger 1.8 turbo engine with 204 hp (152 kW) and 207 pound-feet (280 Newton meters) of torque. Both motors will be mated exclusively to a six-speed automatic transmission, powering to the front wheels. The Hydractive hydropneumatic suspension won’t be available for the 2017 C5 facelift as Citroën has decided to drop it from its portfolio due to the high production costs and low customer demand.

Third generation (2021)

The C5 nameplate was revived on 12 April 2021. Dubbed as the C5 X, the model emphasises the crossover styling and increased ground clearance. The vehicle is intended to be a combination of an SUV, sedan and estate. It is available as a plug-in hybrid with shared technology from the Peugeot 508. Later in the market, the C5 X was marketed as the Dongfeng Citroën Versailles C5 X in China, resurrecting the Versailles name first used in the Ford Versailles.

Safety

Euro NCAP
The C5 X in its standard European configuration received 4 stars from Euro NCAP in 2022.

Sales and production

Notes

References

External links

Official Citroën website

C5
Cars introduced in 2001
2010s cars
2020s cars
Mid-size cars
Hatchbacks
Sedans
Station wagons
Mid-size sport utility vehicles
Crossover sport utility vehicles
Front-wheel-drive vehicles
Euro NCAP large family cars
Cars of China